The Return of the Pharaoh: From the Reminiscences of John H. Watson, M.D. is a Sherlock Holmes pastiche novel by Nicholas Meyer, published in 2021. It takes place after Meyer's other Holmes pastiches, The Seven-Per-Cent Solution, The West End Horror,  The Canary Trainer and The Adventure of the Peculiar Protocols.

Reception
Kirkus Reviews praised the "rousing adventure" but conceded that "the climactic revelation of the murderer will catch some readers sheepishly admitting that they’d forgotten there was a mystery to be solved." Publishers Weekly found the book "disappointing" and said "Fans of the author’s creative reimaginings of Conan Doyle’s characters will hope for a return to form next time." The Associated Press praised the novel, saying it "blends old with new, giving readers familiar stories with parallels to and hints of more modern takes."

References

External links

2021 American novels
Sherlock Holmes novels
Sherlock Holmes pastiches
American mystery novels
Novels by Nicholas Meyer
Novels set in Egypt
Minotaur Books books